Chen, or Chenai (Χῆναι), was a town and polis (city-state) of Oetaea in ancient Thessaly. It is mentioned by Pausanias.

Its location is on Mount Oeta.

References

Populated places in ancient Thessaly
Former populated places in Greece
Thessalian city-states
Oetaea
Mount Oeta